Passion is the fourth studio album by Italian singer In-Grid. It was released in 2009, and it featured songs in French and English languages.

Track listing
 Les Fous - 3:30
 Le Dragueur - 3:14
 Amour Ma Passion - 3:25
 Chaos - 3:18
 Movie Star - 3:49
 Jalousie - 3:17
 Les Jeux Sont Faits - 3:23
 Sweet Desire - 3:27
 Vive Le Swing - 3:22
 C'Est L'Amour - 3:25
 Le Cri Du Cœur - 3:48
 Tout Pour Toi - 3:17
 Papillonne Sur Moi - 3:32
 À Ma Façon - 3:19
 Tu Es Là? (Feat. Pochill) - 3:27

References
In-Grid official site

2009 albums
In-Grid albums